David Marrero and Fernando Verdasco were the defending champions, but Verdasco decided not to participate.  Marrero successfully defended the title alongside Martin Kližan, defeating Nicholas Monroe and Simon Stadler in the final, 6–1, 5–7, [10–7].

Seeds

Draw

Draw

Notes
 The team of Viktor Troicki and Andreas Seppi was forced to withdraw from the tournament as a result of an 18-month ban, which Troicki had to serve starting from July 24, 2013.

References

Sources
 Main Draw

ATP Vegeta Croatia Open - Doubles
2013 Doubles